The Danish Union of Teachers ( or DLF) is a trade union in Denmark.

The union represents 97% of all primary and lower secondary teachers, and in 2005 it had a membership of 85,000.

The union was founded in 1874.  In 1952, it affiliated to the Confederation of Professionals in Denmark, and since 2019, it has been affiliated to its successor, the Danish Trade Union Confederation.  It is also affiliated to Education International.

References

External links

FTF – Confederation of Professionals in Denmark
Education International
Education trade unions
Trade unions in Denmark
Trade unions established in 1874